Samjin Company English Class is a 2020 South Korean comedy-drama film written and directed by Lee Jong-pil, starring Go Ah-sung, Esom and Park Hye-su. It was released on October 21, 2020.

Plot
In 1995, three female employees at Samjin Company, who are given the opportunity to be promoted if they score at least 600 points at the TOEIC test, enroll in English classes. Lee Ja-young from the production management department, Jung Yu-na from the marketing department and Shim Bo-ram from the accounting department had joined the company straight out of high school and are still low-level employees despite being with the company for eight years and possessing necessary practical "street smarts". One day, Ja-young notices polluted waste water leaking from a factory where she had been sent to. Being a lover of mystery novels, she decides to investigate and Yu-na and Bo-ram join her quest to find out what illegal activities their company might be involved in. The challenge remains for them to find and expose the truth without losing their jobs.

Cast
 Go Ah-sung as Lee Ja-young
 Esom as Jung Yoo-na
 Park Hye-su as Shim Bo-ram
 Cho Hyun-chul as Choi Dong-soo 
 Kim Jong-soo as Bong Hyun-chul
 Kim Won-hae as Ahn Gi-chang
 Bae Hae-sun as Ban Eun-kyung
 David Lee McInnis as Billy Park
 Baek Hyun-jin as Oh Tae-young
 Lee Sung-wook as Hong Soo-chul
 Choi Soo-im as Jo Min-jung 
 Jung Yi-seo as Audit office employee	
 Lee Joo-young as Song So-ra
 Tyler Rasch as English instructor

Production
Principal photography began in late October 2019.

Release
The film was theatrically released on October 21, 2020.

It was invited at the 20th New York Asian Film Festival. It was featured in 'Standouts’ strand and screened at Lincoln Center and SVA Theatre in the two-week festival held from August 6 to 22, 2021 in New York.

Reception

Box office
The film topped the South Korean box office for six days following its release.

Accolades

References

External links
 
 
 

2020 films
2020s Korean-language films
2020s feminist films
South Korean comedy-drama films
Films about whistleblowing
Films set in 1995
Films set in Seoul
Lotte Entertainment films
2020 comedy-drama films
Environmental films
South Korean films based on actual events